Shinhan may refer to:

Shinhan Asset Management
Shinhan Bank
Shinhan Card
Shinhan Financial Group